The Yarkand River (or Yarkent River, Yeh-erh-ch'iang Ho) is a river in the Xinjiang Uyghur Autonomous Region of western China. It originates in the Siachen Muztagh in a part of the Karakoram range and flows into the Tarim River or Neinejoung River, with which it is sometimes identified. However, in modern times, the Yarkand river drains into the Midstream Reservoir and exhausts its supply without reaching the Tarim river.

A part of the river valley is known to the Kyrgyz people as Raskam Valley, and the upper course of the river itself is called the Raskam River. Another name of the river is Zarafshan.  The area was once claimed by the ruler of Hunza.

Course 
The river originates from the Siachen Muztagh in the Karakoram range in India–Sinkiang border region, south of the Kashgar Prefecture. It flows roughly due north until reaching the foot of the Kunlun Mountains. Then it flows northwest where it receives waters from the Shaksgam River, which originates from the many glaciers draining the north flanks of the great Karakorum range. The Shaksgam River is also known in its lower course (before falling into the Yarkand) as the Keleqing River.

Then Yarkand River flows north, through the Bolor-Tagh mountains parallel to the Tashkurgan valley, eventually receiving the waters of the Tashkurgan River from the west. It is then impounded by the Aratax dam, which was completed in 2019 to store  for flood control, irrigation and hydropower generation.

After this, the river turns northeast and enters the Tarim Basin, forming a rich oasis that waters the Yarkant county.  Continuing northeast, it receives the Kashgar River from the west, eventually draining into the Shangyou Reservoir.

Even though the river originally drained into the Tarim River, development along its course in recent decades has depleted its flow. During the period 1986 to 2000, it flowed into the Tarim River only once.  

The drainage area of Yarkand is 108,000 sq. km. It irrigates areas in Taxkorgan, Yecheng, Poskam, Yarkand, Makit and Bachu counties. It also irrigates ten mission fields in the Agricultural Division.

History 
The ancient Silk Route into South Asia followed the Yarkand River valley. From Aksu, it went via Maral Bashi (Bachu) on the bank of the Yarkand River,  to the city of Yarkand (Shache). From Yarkand, the route crossed the Bolor-Tagh mountains through the river valleys of Yarkand and Tashkurgan to reach the town of Tashkurgan. From there, it crossed the Karakoram mountains through one of the western passes (Kilik, Mintaka or Khunjerab) to reach Gilgit in northern Kashmir.  Then it went on to Gandhara (the vicinity of present day Peshawar). The Indian merchants from Gandhara introduced the Kharosthi script into the Tarim Basin, and the Buddhist monks followed in their wake, spreading Buddhism. The Chinese Buddhist traveller Fa Xian is believed to have followed this route.

With the Arab conquest of Khurasan in 651 AD, the main Silk route to western Asia was interrupted, and the importance of the South Asian route increased. Gilgit as well as Baltistan find increased mention in the Chinese chronicles (under the names Great Po-lu and Little Po-lu, from the old name Bolor). China invaded Gilgit in 747 AD to secure its routes to Gandhara and prevent Tibetan influence. But the effects of the invasion appear to have been short-lived, as Turkic rule took hold in Gilgit.

It is possible that alternative trade routes developed after this time between Yarkand and Ladakh via the Karakash Valley. The region of Hunza adjoining Xinjiang, which contained the passes through the Karakoram range, began to split off from Gilgit as an independent state around 997, and internecine wars with Gilgit as well as neighbouring Nagar became frequent. The rising importance of the Ladakh route is illustrated by the raids into Ladakh conducted by Mirza Abu Bakr Dughlat who took control of Kashgaria in 1465. His successor, Sultan Said Khan launched a proper invasion of Ladakh and Kashmir in 1532, led by his general Mirza Haidar Dughlat.

Gallery

Notes

References

Bibliography

External links 
 Yarkand River plotted on OpenStreetMap.

Rivers of Xinjiang
Sites along the Silk Road
Karakoram